Dalima is a genus of moths in the family Geometridae erected by Frederic Moore in 1868.

Species

References

Boarmiini